Robert L. Bernasconi (born 1950) is Edwin Erle Sparks Professor of Philosophy at Pennsylvania State University. He is known as a reader of Martin Heidegger and Emmanuel Levinas, and for his work on the concept of race. He has also written on the history of philosophy.

Career 
Bernasconi received his doctorate from Sussex University. He taught at the University of Essex for thirteen years before taking up a position at the University of Memphis. In the fall of 2009 he moved from Memphis to the philosophy department at Pennsylvania State University. Bernasconi comes from an academic family and was born in Newcastle, United Kingdom. His brother John is the Director of Fine arts at the University of Hull. The family are of Italian background.

Interests 
In addition to extensive work on Heidegger and Levinas, Bernasconi has written on Immanuel Kant, Georg Wilhelm Friedrich Hegel, Hannah Arendt, Hans-Georg Gadamer, Jean-Paul Sartre, Frantz Fanon, Jacques Derrida, and numerous others.

In the early 1990s Bernasconi began to develop an interest in the concepts of race and racism, particularly in relation to the history of philosophy. In addition to writing many articles on race, racism, slavery, African philosophy and related topics, he has also edited and published primary material relating to these themes.

Bibliography

Books authored
How to Read Sartre (New York: W. W. Norton, 2007).
Heidegger in Question: The Art of Existing (Atlantic Highlands: Humanities Press, 1993).
The Question of Language in Heidegger's History of Being (Atlantic Highlands: Humanities Press, 1985).

Books edited
Race, Hybridity, and Miscegenation (Bristol: Thoemmes, 2005). With Kristie Dotson.
Race and Anthropology (Bristol: Thoemmes, 2003).
Race and Racism in Continental Philosophy (Bloomington: Indiana University Press, 2003). With Sybol Cook.
American Theories of Polygenesis (Bristol: Thoemmes, 2002).
The Cambridge Companion to Levinas (Cambridge: Cambridge University Press, 2002). With Simon Critchley.
Concepts of Race in the Eighteenth Century (Bristol: Thoemmes, 2001).
Race (Oxford: Blackwell, 2001).
In Proximity: Emmanuel Levinas and the Eighteenth Century (Lubbock, Texas: Texas Tech University Press, 2001). With Melvin New & Richard A. Cohen.
The Idea of Race (Indianapolis: Hackett Publishing, 2000). With Tommy Lee Lott.
Re-Reading Levinas (Bloomington: Indiana University Press, 1991). With Simon Critchley.
The Provocation of Levinas (New York: Routledge, 1988). With David Wood.
Derrida and Différance (Warwick: Parousia Press, 1985; Evanston: Northwestern University Press, 1988 [United States]). With David Wood.
Time and Metaphysics (Coventry: Parousia Press, 1982). With David Wood.

Selected articles
"Race, Culture, History," in The Philosophy of Race, ed. Paul C. Taylor (New York:  Routledge, 2012), 41–56.
"Crossed Lines in the Racialization Process: Race as a Border Concept," Research in Phenomenology 42 (2012): 206–28.
"The Policing of Race Mixing: The Place of Biopower within the History of Racisms," Journal of Bioethical Inquiry 7 (2010): 205–16.
"Race and Earth in Heidegger's Thinking During the Late 1930s," Southern Journal of Philosophy 48 (2010): 49–66.
"Must We Avoid Speaking of Religion? The Truths of Religions," Research in Phenomenology 39 (2009): 204–23.
"'Our Duty to Conserve': W. E. B. Du Bois's Philosophy of History in Context," South Atlantic Quarterly 108 (2009): 519–40.
"A Haitian in Paris: Anténor Firmin as a philosopher against racism," Patterns of Prejudice 42 (2008): 365–83.
"Can Race be Thought in Terms of Facticity: A Reconsideration of Sartre's and Fanon's Existential Theories of Race," in François Raffoul & Eric Sean Nelson, Rethinking Facticity (Albany: State University of New York Press, 2008).
"Black Skin, White Skulls: The Nineteenth Century Debate over the Racial Identity of the Ancient Egyptians," Parallax 13 (2007): 6–20.
"'Y'all don't hear me now': On Lorenzo Simpson's The Unfinished Project," Philosophy and Social Criticism 33 (2007): 289–99.
"Sartre's Response to Merleau-Ponty's Charge of Subjectivism," Philosophy Today 50 (2006): 113–125.
"What are Prophets for? Negotiating the Teratological Hypocrisy of Judeo-Hellenic Europe," Revista portuguesa de filosofía 62 (2006): 441–55.
"The Contradictions of Racism: Locke, Slavery, and the Two Treatises," in Andrew Valls (ed.), Race and Racism in Modern Philosophy (Ithaca: Cornell University Press, 2005): 89–107. With Anika Maaza Mann.
"Levinas and the Struggle for Existence," in Eric Sean Nelson, Antje Kapust & Kent Still (eds.), Addressing Levinas (Evanston: Northwestern University Press, 2005).
"Lévy-Bruhl among the Phenomenologists: Exoticisation and the Logic of ‘the Primitive’," Social Identities 11 (2005): 229–45.
"Identity and Agency in Frantz Fanon," Sartre Studies International 10, 2 (2004): 106–9.
"No Exit: Levinas’ Aporetic Account of Transcendence," Research in Phenomenology 35 (2005): 101–17.
Hegel's Racism: A Reply to McCarney, Radical Philosophy 119 (2003).
"Will the Real Kant Please Stand Up: The Challenge of Enlightenment Racism to the Study of the History of Philosophy," Radical Philosophy 117 (2003): 13–22.
"With What Must the History of Philosophy Begin? Hegel's Role in the Debate on the Place of India within the History of Philosophy," in David A. Duquette (ed.), Hegel's History of Philosophy: New Interpretations (Albany: State University of New York Press, 2003): 35–49.
"The Assumption of Negritude: Aimé Césaire, Frantz Fanon, and the Vicious Circle of Racial Politics," Parallax 8, 2 (2002): 69–83.
"Emmanuel Levinas: The Phenomenology of Sociality and the Ethics of Alterity," in John Drummond (ed.), Phenomenological Approaches to Moral Philosophy (Dordrecht: Kluwer, 2002): 249–268. With Stacy Keltner.
"The Ghetto and Race," in David Theo Goldberg & John Solomos (eds.), A Companion to Racial and Ethnic Studies (Oxford: Blackwell, 2002): 340–48.
"What is the Question to which 'Substitution' is the Answer?" in Bernasconi & Critchley (eds.), The Cambridge Companion to Levinas (2002): 234–51.
"Eliminating the Cycle of Violence: The Place of A Dying Colonialism within Fanon's Revolutionary Thought," Philosophia Africana 4, 2 (2001): 17–25.
"Who Invented the Concept of Race? Kant's Role in the Enlightenment Construction of Race," in Bernasconi (ed.), Race (2001): 11–36.
"Almost Always More Than Philosophy Proper," Research in Phenomenology 30 (2000): 1–11.
"The Invisibility of Racial Minorities in the Public Realm of Appearances," in Kevin Thompson & Lester Embree (eds.), Phenomenology of the Political (Netherlands: Kluwer, 2000): 169–87.
"Krimskrams: Hegel and the Current Controversy about the Beginnings of Philosophy," in Charles E. Scott & John Sallis (eds.), Interrogating the Tradition: Hermeneutics and the History of Philosophy (Albany: State University of New York Press, 2000): 191–208.
"With What Must the Philosophy of World History Begin? On the Racial Basis of Hegel's Eurocentrism," Nineteenth Century Contexts 22 (2000): 171–201.
"Expecting the Unexpected," in James Watson (ed.), Portraits of American Continental Philosophers (Bloomington: Indiana University Press, 1999): 13–24.
"Richard J. Bernstein: Hannah Arendt's Alleged Evasion of the Question of Jewish Identity," Continental Philosophy Review 32 (1999): 472–78.
"The Third Party: Levinas on the Intersection of the Ethical and the Political," Journal of the British Society for Phenomenology, 30 (1999): 76–87.
"The Truth that Accuses: Conscience, Shame, and Guilt in Levinas and Augustine," in Gary B. Madison & Marty Fairbairn (eds.), The Ethics of Postmodernity (Evanston: Northwestern University Press, 1999): 24–34.
"'We Philosophers': Barbaros medeis eisito," in Rebecca Comay & John McCumber (eds.), Endings: Questions of Memory in Hegel and Heidegger (Evanston: Northwestern University Press, 1999).
"Different Styles of Eschatology: Derrida's Take on Levinas' Political Messianism," Research in Phenomenology 28 (1998): 3–19.
"Hegel at the Court of the Ashanti," in Stuart Barnett (ed.), Hegel after Derrida (New York & London: Routledge, 1998): 41–63.
"African Philosophy's Challenge to Continental Philosophy," in Emmanuel Chukwudi Eze (ed.), Postcolonial African Philosophy: A Critical Reader (Oxford: Blackwell, 1997).
"Justice Without Ethics?", PLI—Warwick Journal of Philosophy 6 (1997): 58–67.
"Eckhart's Anachorism," Graduate Faculty Philosophy Journal 19, 2–20, 1 (1997): 81–90.
"Opening the Future: The Paradox of Promising in the Hobbesian Social Contract," Philosophy Today 41 (1997): 77–86.
"Philosophy's Paradoxical Parochialism: The Reinvention of Philosophy as Greek," in Keith Ansell-Pearson, Benita Parry, & Judith Squires (eds.), Cultural Readings of Imperialism: Edward Said and the Gravity of History (New York: St. Martin's Press, 1997): 212–26.
"The Violence of the Face: Peace and Language in the Thought of Levinas," Philosophy and Social Criticism 23, 6 (1997): 81–93.
"What Comes Around Goes Around: Derrida and Levinas on the Economy of the Gift and the Gift of Genealogy," in Alan D. Schrift (ed.), The Logic of the Gift: Toward an Ethic of Generosity (New York & London: Routledge, 1997): 256–73.
"Casting the Slough: Fanon’s New Humanism for a New Humanity," in Lewis R. Gordon, T. Denean Sharpley-Whiting & Renée T. White (eds.), Fanon: A Critical Reader (Oxford, Blackwell, 1996): 113–21.
"The Double Face of the Political and the Social: Hannah Arendt and America's Racial Divisions," Research in Phenomenology 26 (1996): 3–24.
"Heidegger and the Invention of the Western Philosophical Tradition," Journal of the British Society for Phenomenology 26 (1995): 240–54.
"‘I Will Tell You Who You Are.’ Heidegger on Greco-German Destiny and Amerikanismus," in Babette E. Babich (ed.), From Phenomenology to Thought, Errancy, and Desire: Essays in Honor of William J. Richardson, S. J. (Dordrecht: Kluwer Academic Publishers, 1995).
"On Heidegger’s Other Sins of Omission: His Exclusion of Asian Thought from the Origins of Occidental Metaphysics and His Denial of the Possibility of Christian Philosophy," American Catholic Philosophical Quarterly 69 (1995): 333–50.
"'Only the Persecuted...: Language of the Oppressor, Language of the Oppressed," in Adriaan T. Peperzak (ed.), Ethics as First Philosophy: The Significance of Emmanuel Levinas for Philosophy, Literature and Religion (New York & London: Routledge, 1995): 77–86.
"Sartre's Gaze Returned: The Transformation of the Phenomenology of Racism," Graduate Faculty Philosophy Journal 18, 2 (1995) 201–21.
"'You Don't Know What I'm Talking About': Alterity and the Hermeneutic Ideal," in Lawrence K. Schmidt (ed.), The Specter of Relativism: Truth, Dialogue, and Phronesis in Philosophical Hermeneutics (Evanston: Northwestern University Press, 1995): 178–94.
"Repetition and Tradition: Heidegger's Destructuring of the Distinction Between Essence and Existence in Basic Problems of Phenomenology," in Theodore Kisiel & John van Buren (eds.), Reading Heidegger from the Start: Essays in His Earliest Thought (Albany: State University of New York Press, 1994).
"On Deconstructing Nostalgia for Community within the West: The Debate Between Nancy and Blanchot," Research in Phenomenology 23 (1993): 3–21.
"Politics Beyond Humanism: Mandela and the Struggle against Apartheid," in Gary B. Madison (ed.), Working Through Derrida (Evanston: Northwestern University Press, 1993): 94–120.
"Locke's Almost Random Talk of Man: The Double Use of Words in the Natural Law Justification of Slavery," Perspektiven der Philosophie: Neues Jahrbuch 18 (1992): 293–318.
"No More Stories, Good or Bad: de Man's Criticisms of Derrida on Rousseau," in David Wood (ed.), Derrida: A Critical Reader (Oxford: Blackwell, 1992).
"Who is my Neighbor? Who is the Other? Questioning 'the Generosity of Western Thought'," in Ethics and Responsibility in the Phenomenological Tradition: The Ninth Annual Symposium of the Simon Silverman Phenomenology Center (Pittsburgh: Simon Silverman Phenomenology Center, Duquesne University, 1992): 1–31.
"Habermas and Arendt on the Philosopher's 'Error': Tracking the Diabolical in Heidegger," Graduate Faculty Philosophy Journal, 14, 2 (1991): 3-24.
"Skepticism in the Face of Philosophy," in Bernasconi & Critchley (eds.), Re-Reading Levinas (1991): 149–61.
"The Ethics of Suspicion," Research in Phenomenology 20 (1990): 3–18.
"The Heidegger Controversy," German Historical Institute London Bulletin 12 (1990): 3–9.
"Rousseau and the Supplement to the Social Contract: Deconstruction and the Possibility of Democracy," Cardozo Law Review 11 (1990): 1539–64.
"One-Way Traffic: The Ontology of Decolonization and its Ethics," in Galen A. Johnson & Michael B. Smith (eds.), Ontology and Alterity in Merleau-Ponty (Evanston: Northwestern University Press, 1990): 14–26.
"Heidegger’s Destruction of Phronesis," Southern Journal of Philosophy 28 supp. (1989): 127–47.
"Rereading Totality and Infinity," in Arleen B. Dallery & Charles E. Scott (eds.), The Question of the Other (Albany: State University of New York Press, 1989): 23–34.
"Seeing Double: Destruktion and Deconstruction," in Diane P. Michelfelder & Richard E. Palmer (eds.), Dialogue and Deconstruction: The Gadamer-Derrida Encounter (Albany: State University of New York Press, 1989).
"Deconstruction and Scholarship," Man and World 21 (1988): 223–30.
"'Failure of communication' as a Surplus: Dialogue and Lack of Dialogue between Buber and Levinas," in Bernasconi & Wood (eds.), The Provocation of Levinas: Rethinking the Other (1988): 100–35.
"The Silent, Anarchic World of the Evil Genius," in Guiseppina Moneta, John Sallis & Jacques Taminiaux (eds.), The Collegium Phaenomenologicum: The First Ten Years (Dordrecht: Martinus Nijhoff, 1988): 257–72.
"Fundamental Ontology, Metontology and the Ethics of Ethics," Irish Philosophical Journal 4 (1987): 76–93.
"Levinas: Philosophy and Beyond," in Hugh J. Silverman (ed.), Continental Philosophy 1 (New York: Routledge, 1987): 232–58.
"Technology and the Ethics of Praxis," Acta Institutionis Philosophiae et Aestheticae (Tokyo) 5 (1987): 93–108.
"Hegel and Levinas: The Possibility of Reconciliation and Forgiveness," Archivio di Filosophia 54 (1986): 325–46.
"Levinas and Derrida: The Question of the Closure of Metaphysics," in Richard A. Cohen (ed.), Face to Face with Levinas (Albany: State University of New York Press, 1986): 181–202.
"The Good and the Beautiful," in W. S. Hamrick (ed.), Phenomenology in Practice and Theory (Dordrecht: Martinus Nijhoff, 1985).
"The Trace of Levinas in Derrida," in Bernasconi & Wood (eds.), Derrida and Différance (1985): 13–30.
"Levinas Face to Face—With Hegel," Journal of the British Society for Phenomenology 13 (1982): 267–76.
"Levinas on Time and the Instant," in Bernasconi & Wood (eds.), Time and Metaphysics (1982): 199–217.

See also
list of deconstructionists
Africana philosophy
Other (philosophy)
Critical race theory
Racism

References

Living people
Continental philosophers
20th-century American philosophers
1950 births
Alumni of the University of Sussex
Academics of the University of Essex
University of Memphis faculty
Heidegger scholars
Levinas scholars
21st-century American philosophers